Tsamma juice is a brand of watermelon juice, produced by Frey Farms since 2014. The juice is also available ready-mixed with coconut water or blueberry juice.

The brand is named after Tsamma, a local name for a type of watermelon found in sub-Saharan Africa, said to be "the Mother of all watermelon varieties"; however, the juice is farmed from watermelons grown in the Midwest and Southern United States.

History
The juice was first produced by company founder Sarah Frey, aged 16, following a traditional family recipe. She established a full-time business after graduating from high school, realizing there was no commercial distributor of watermelon juice, and was shipping to 150 stores by the end of the first year of production. Frey has suggested that the juice could be a suitable replacement for coconut water.

References

External links
 

Drink companies of the United States
Food and drink companies established in 2014
Juice brands